Viral Survival, known in Japan as , is an action game developed by PeakVox and published by Fun Unit Inc. and NIS America for Wii in 2009-2011. The game was later released worldwide for Microsoft Windows via Steam under the name PeakVox Escape Virus HD on November 9, 2016.

Reception

The Wii version received "average" reviews according to the review aggregation website Metacritic.

References

External links
 

2009 video games
Action video games
Nippon Ichi Software games
Video games developed in Japan
WiiWare games
Windows games